Fernando Herrera Ávila (born 6 August 1968) is a Mexican politician affiliated with the PAN. He currently serves as Senator of the LXII Legislature of the Mexican Congress representing Aguascalientes

He also served as deputy of the Chamber of Deputies during the 2000-2003 legislature, and previously in the Congress of Aguascalientes.

References

1968 births
Living people
Politicians from Tabasco
Members of the Chamber of Deputies (Mexico)
Members of the Senate of the Republic (Mexico)
National Action Party (Mexico) politicians
21st-century Mexican politicians
Politicians from Jalisco
Autonomous University of Aguascalientes alumni
Universidad del Valle de México alumni
Members of the Congress of Aguascalientes
20th-century Mexican politicians
Senators of the LXII and LXIII Legislatures of Mexico